CocoWalk is an open-air shopping mall in the Coconut Grove neighborhood of Miami, Florida, in the United States.

The CocoWalk mall opened in 1990. It started as a popular local venue and lost its edge over the years.

In 2006, PMAT Real Estate Investments purchased the Cocowalk mall for $87 million, and then sold it for $87.5 million to the Maryland-based Federal Realty Investment Trust in 2015, its fifth owner since its opening.

External links
CocoWalk official website

Buildings and structures in Miami
Shopping malls in Miami-Dade County, Florida
Tourist attractions in Miami
Shopping malls established in 1990
Coconut Grove (Miami)